Saint-Lucien is a commune in the Seine-Maritime department in the Normandy region in northern France. Between 1973 and 2017 it was part of the commune Sigy-en-Bray.

Population

See also
Communes of the Seine-Maritime department

References

Saintlucien